José Leonardo Morales Lares (born 7 July 1978 in El Tigre) is a Venezuelan football goalkeeper who plays for Zulia and formerly the Venezuela national team.

References

External links
 

1978 births
Living people
Venezuelan footballers
Venezuela international footballers
2011 Copa América players
Association football goalkeepers
Zulia F.C. players
Trujillanos FC players
Deportivo Táchira F.C. players
Deportivo Anzoátegui players
Estudiantes de Mérida players
Carabobo F.C. players
People from El Tigre